Ayah Shah is a constituency of the Uttar Pradesh Legislative Assembly covering the city of Ayah Shah in the Fatehpur district of Uttar Pradesh, India.

Ayah Shah is one of six assembly constituencies in the Fatehpur Lok Sabha constituency. Since 2008, this assembly constituency is numbered 241 amongst 403 constituencies.

Currently this seat belongs to Bharatiya Janata Party candidate Vikas Gupta who won in last Assembly election of 2017 Uttar Pradesh Legislative Elections defeating Samajwadi Party candidate Ayodhya Prasad by a margin of 51,965 votes.

Elected MLAs

Election results

2022

References

External links
 

Assembly constituencies of Uttar Pradesh
Fatehpur district